Ravand-e Olya may refer to:
 Ravand-e Olya, Hamadan (راوندعليا - Rāvand-e ‘Olyā)
 Ravand-e Olya, West Azerbaijan (روندعليا - Ravand-e ‘Olyā)